Schwaub (also, Schwab)  is a former settlement in Inyo County, California.

In 1905, gold was discovered nearby, and the town was built. The Schwab post office opened and closed in 1907.

The town was named for Charles M. Schwab, and had several saloons, a blacksmith, a boarding house, and a general store. However, the town was taken over by three women who drove out the town's saloons, and as a result, most of Schwab's men, leading to the eventual decline of the town. The Stray Horse mine, which served the workers who lived in Schwab, still stands today, along with several buildings of the town, and items such as cans and shattered glass.

References

Former settlements in Inyo County, California
Populated places in the Mojave Desert
Mining communities in California
Death Valley
Former populated places in California
Populated places established in 1905
1905 establishments in California